Frederik Rodenberg Madsen (born 22 January 1998) is a Danish professional road and track cyclist, who currently rides for UCI WorldTeam . He rode in the men's team pursuit at the 2016 UCI Track Cycling World Championships winning a bronze medal.

Major results

Track

2015
 2nd  Team pursuit, UEC European Championships
2016
 1st  Madison (with Casper von Folsach, National Championships
 3rd  Team pursuit, Olympic Games
 3rd  Team pursuit, UCI World Championships
2017
 1st Team pursuit, UCI World Cup, Cali
2018
 2nd  Team pursuit, UCI World Championships
2019
 1st  Team pursuit, UEC European Championships
 UCI Track World Cup
1st Team pursuit, Glasgow
1st Team pursuit, Minsk
2020
 1st  Team pursuit, UCI World Championships
2021
 2nd  Team pursuit, Olympic Games

Road

2015
 3rd Road race, National Junior Championships
2016
 National Junior Championships
1st  Road race
2nd Time trial
 1st Stage 2a (ITT) Keizer der Juniores
2017 
 4th Overall Paris–Arras Tour
1st Stage 2
2019
 1st  Road race, National Under-23 Championships
 1st Skive–Løbet
 1st Eschborn–Frankfurt Under-23
2020 
 1st Stage 2 Bałtyk–Karkonosze Tour
 7th Paris–Tours Espoirs

References

External links

1998 births
Living people
Danish male cyclists
Danish track cyclists
Olympic cyclists of Denmark
Cyclists at the 2016 Summer Olympics
Cyclists at the 2020 Summer Olympics
Medalists at the 2016 Summer Olympics
Medalists at the 2020 Summer Olympics
Olympic silver medalists for Denmark
Olympic bronze medalists for Denmark
Olympic medalists in cycling
UCI Track Cycling World Champions (men)
People from Furesø Municipality
Sportspeople from the Capital Region of Denmark